Gaelscoil Ultain is an Irish language primary education school situated on the hill on the Clones Road in Monaghan since the school was founded in 1986. It provides for the educational needs of boys and girls from Junior Infants to Rang 6. There were 214 pupils on roll in September 2009. There are more than 150 All-Irish schools in Ireland with recognition from the Department of Education. Gaelscoileanna are allocated an extra teacher and a higher capitation grant than an equivalent English medium school.

History
Following an application in early 1986 to set up an all-Irish primary school in Monaghan town, the Department of Education authorised an all-Irish stream as part of St Mary's Boys National School. The first class of 23 children was based in the old Brothers' House adjacent to the St. Mary's building and commenced in September 1986.

The all-Irish stream, Sruth Ultain, continued for three years and in 1989, the department sanctioned an independent school, Gaelscoil Ultain. The school has since been situated in the Old Brothers’ School and was blessed by Dr. Joseph Duffy, Bishop of Clogher, in May 1990.

The school celebrated 25 years in existence in 2011 with a programme of events that included a St Patrick's Day parade in March, a 'Ceolchoirm Paistí' in April and a reunion event in June.

Location
Having been in the Old Brother's school building at the top of the hill on the Clones Road since 1989, it was announced in 2011 that an educational campus on the site of the Army Barracks in Monaghan Town would be built, and in particular, the inclusion on the campus of a new permanent building for Gaelscoil Ultain.

References

External links
 Ultain.ie - School homepage
 ScoilUltain.ie - 25 year celebration photo gallery (archived 2010)

1986 establishments in Ireland
Buildings and structures in Monaghan (town)
Educational institutions established in 1986
Education in County Monaghan
Gaelscoil
Irish-language schools and college